Cristina Mucci (born 24 January 1949)  is an Argentine writer and journalist. Since 1987 she has been directing and producing the television program Los siete locos, dedicated to the dissemination of books and culture. She is the author of books about Argentine writers, such as Leopoldo Lugones and three emblematic women of Argentine literature from the 1950s–60s: Marta Lynch, Silvina Bullrich, and Beatriz Guido.

Career
Cristina Mucci earned a law degree from the Pontifical Catholic University of Argentina. She worked as a cultural journalist at the newspapers La Voz and La Razón where she was editor of the cultural page, as well as publishing articles in magazines and newspapers such as Clarín and La Nación.

Since 1987, she has been directing the television program Los siete locos, dedicated to the dissemination of books and culture, for which she won four Martín Fierro Awards. She hosted the program Encuentros directed by Oscar Barney Finn, wrote scripts for the programs about Victoria Ocampo and Silvina Ocampo for the DNI cycle and the special about the 20th anniversary of the Julio Cortázar's death.

Awards and distinctions
 Martín Fierro Awards (1995, 1996, 1998, 2002)
 APTRA Special Career Award
 1998 Julio Cortázar Award from the Argentine Book Chamber
 Los siete locos declared of cultural interest by the Secretary of Culture and the Chamber of Deputies
 2007 Konex Award for Literature
 2010 Bicentennial Medal from the City of Buenos Aires

Publications
 Voces de la cultura argentina, El Ateneo, 1997, 
 La señora Lynch, biography of the writer Marta Lynch, Grupo Editorial Norma, 2000, 
 Divina Beatrice, biography of the writer Beatriz Guido, 2002, 
 La gran burguesa, biography of the writer Silvina Bullrich, Grupo Editorial Norma, 2003, 
 Pensar la Argentina, Grupo Editorial Norma, 2006, 
 Leopoldo Lugones, los escritores y el poder, Ediciones B, 2009,

References

External links

  

1949 births
20th-century Argentine women writers
20th-century Argentine writers
21st-century Argentine women writers
21st-century Argentine writers
Argentine television directors
Argentine television journalists
Argentine women journalists
Argentine women lawyers
Journalists from Buenos Aires
Living people
Pontifical Catholic University of Argentina alumni
Women television directors
Women television journalists
20th-century women lawyers